Wormwood is an Australian children's television program that premiered on Channel Ten on 4 October 2007. It also screened in 2008 on the ABC, as part of the Rollercoaster show. It also showed on Foxtel's Disney channel in 2008.

There are 13 episodes based on the stories by Paul Jennings.

Storyline
The Bourke family relocate to the strange town of Wormwood who's economy is driven by poo from giant earthworms.

Cast
Kelly Paterniti as Danni Bourke
Nick Stevenson as Ned Bourke 
Karli-Rae Grogan as Sally Schnozz
Valentina Barron as Jarrod Schnozz
Shannon Lively as Hairball
David Moran as Ken Schnozz
Igor Sas as Mick Bourke

References

Australian children's television series
2007 Australian television series debuts
Network 10 original programming
Television shows set in Western Australia